XHRPA-FM is a radio station on 102.5 FM in Morelia, Michoacán. It is owned by Ultra and is known as Radio Ranchito with a ranchera format.

History
XEQB-AM 1240 received its concession on December 13, 1966, to Radio Televisión de Morelia, S.A. Within just a few years, the callsign was changed to XERPA-AM. It broadcast initially with 500 watts, later with 1,000, and by the end of the AM era, 5,000 watts daytime.

XERPA was cleared to move to FM in 2011.

References

Radio stations in Michoacán